Tatum is an English personal name of Old English origin, meaning "Tata’s homestead" It is in use for both boys and girls. 

People named Tatum include:

 Tatum Bell (born 1981), American retired National Football League running back
 Tatum Gressette (1900-1997), American college football head coach at The Citadel
 Tatum Keshwar (born 1983), South African fashion model and Miss South Africa 2008
 Tatum O'Neal (born 1963), American actress and author
 Tatum Reed (born 1980), American pornographic actress and movie producer
 Tatum McRae (born 2003) Canadian singer and dancer

See also
 Tatum (disambiguation)

Notes

English-language unisex given names